This is a list of schools in Fukushima.

Senior high schools 
Senior high schools in Fukushima are operated by both Fukushima Prefecture and private companies.

Junior high schools 
Most junior high schools within the city are operated by the Fukushima City Board of Education, however two junior high schools are privately operated, and one, Fukushima University Attached Junior High School, is a national school run by Fukushima University.

Elementary schools 
The Fukushima City Board of Education operates the majority of elementary schools in the city. However, Fukushima University operates a single national elementary school while Sakura no Seibo operates a private elementary school.

Special assistance schools 
Various special assistance schools for the blind, handicapped, and other general disabilities are operated by Fukushima University, Fukushima Prefecture, and Fukushima City.

References

Fukushima (city)
Schools in Fukushima Prefecture